Buddam may refer to:

 Buddam, India, a village in Andhra Pradesh, India
 Buddam (unit), a unit of mass used in the pearl trade in Mumbai (formerly Bombay) in the 19th century